Compsolechia lithomorpha is a moth of the family Gelechiidae. It was described by Edward Meyrick in 1914. It is found in Guyana, Brazil and Peru.

The wingspan is 13–15 mm. The forewings are glossy dark violet slaty grey. The hindwings are dark fuscous, in males sometimes thinly scaled in the disc towards the base.

References

Moths described in 1914
Compsolechia
Taxa named by Edward Meyrick